Katastrophe may refer to:

Katastrophe (rapper) (born 1979), American rapper 
"Katastrophe", an episode of SWAT Kats: The Radical Squadron
Katastrophe, a character in the  comic book series Empowered

See also
Catastrophe (disambiguation)
Katastrofe (Petter Bjørklund Kristiansen, born 1989), Norwegian singer and songwriter